Sarina Beach is a coastal town and locality in the Mackay Region, Queensland, Australia.

Geography 
The locality is bounded to east by the Coral Sea, to the south by the Sarina Inlet and Plane Creek, and to the west by the Goonyella railway line that carries coal from the Bowen Basin coalfields to Hay Point for shipping.

Praguelands railway station ion the Goonyella railway line is on the boundary of the localities of Sarina and Sarina Beach..

Sarina Beach Road connects the town of Sarina to the south-east to the town of Sarah Beach on the east coast of the locality.

Coastal features 
Sarina Beach has the following coastal features (from west to east):

 Biltofts Beach
 Sarina Inlet
 Point Salisbury
 Johnsons Beach
 Perpetua Point
 Sarina Beach, the beach

History 
The name ultimately derives the Sarina Inlet, believed to be named by surveyor William Charles Borlase Wilson from Greek mythology meaning enchantress.

The beach became popular with beachgoers in the late 1920s with the first house built in 1928 for Mrs Campbell senior, who established a business providing dressing room facilities.

Education 
There are no schools in Sarina Beach. The nearest government primary schools are Alligator Creek State School in Alligator Creek to the north-west and Sarina State School in neighbouring Sarina to the south-east. The nearest government secondary school is Sarina State High School also in Sarina.

References

External links 
 Town map of Sarina Beach, 1979

Towns in Queensland
Mackay Region
Coastline of Queensland
Localities in Queensland